The following is an overview of the events of 1899 in film, including a list of films released and notable births.

Events
September
King John, a silent compilation of three short scenes from a forthcoming stage production by Herbert Beerbohm Tree with film direction by William Kennedy Dickson and Walter Pfeffer Dando, is filmed in London, the first known film based on a Shakespeare play.
Mitchell and Kenyon of Blackburn in the north of England release three fiction films under the 'Norden' brand which attract national attention – The Tramp's Surprise, The Tramps and the Artist and Kidnapping by Indians, the latter being the first Western.
November – The oldest surviving Japanese film, Momijigari, is shot by Tsunekichi Shibata in Tokyo as a record of kabuki actors Onoe Kikugorō V and Ichikawa Danjūrō IX performing a scene from the play Momijigari.
T. C. Hepworth invents Biokam, a 17.5 mm format which also is the first format to have a center perforation.
John Alfred Prestwich invents a 13 mm amateur format.

Films released in 1899

 Beauty and the Beast, produced for Pathe (French)
 The Biter Bit, produced by Bamforth & Co Ltd
 Cagliostro's Mirror, directed by George Melies
 Cinderella (Cendrillon), directed by Georges Méliès
 Cleopatra,  directed by George Melies, later re-released as Cleopatra's Tomb
 Cripple Creek Bar-Room Scene, produced by Edison Studios
 The Demon Barber, produced by American Mutoscope
 The Devil in a Convent, directed by Georges Méliès, later re-released as The Sign of the Cross
 The Dreyfus Affair, a series of docudramas directed by Georges Méliès
 The Haunted House, directed by Siegmund Lubin
 How Would You Like to Be the Ice Man?
 The Jeffries-Sharkey Fight, a documentary that is in all likelihood lost; running over two hours, this is one of the oldest feature films
 Kidnapping by Indians
 King John
 The Kiss in the Tunnel, directed by George Albert Smith; has been cited as cinema's first example of narrative editing
 Major Wilson's Last Stand
 A Midnight Episode, directed by George Melies, aka A Good Bed
 The Miser's Doom (British),  directed by Walter R. Booth
 A Mysterious Portrait, directed by Georges Méliès
 Pillar of Fire (aka The Column of Fire), directed by George Melies, adapting a scene from the novel "She" by H. Rider Haggard
 Raising Spirits, directed by George Melies

Births

External links

References 

 
Film by year